Kuwait has 1,487 mosques (2016).

See also

 Lists of mosques
 Islam in Kuwait

References

Kuwait
 
Mosques